Events from the year 1857 in China.

Incumbents 
 Xianfeng Emperor (7th year)

Viceroys
 Viceroy of Zhili —  Guiliang (- Jan.), Tan Tingxiang (Jan. - )

Events 
 Nian Rebellion
 Second Opium War
 January 4 — Battle of Macao Fort 
 December 28–31 — Battle of Canton (1857)
 Taiping Rebellion
 Miao Rebellion (1854–73)
 Panthay Rebellion
 Ningpo massacre
 April 20 — James Bruce, 8th Earl of Elgin appointed plenipotentiary to China.

Births 
 Canton — Gin Chow, (1857 – 1933) Chinese immigrant who gained fame in California as a prophet and fortune teller able to predict the weather and other natural events
 Penang, British Malaya — Gu Hongming, (1857 – 1928) was a British Malaya born Chinese man of letters. He also used the pen name "Amoy Ku", later served in the Qing government
 Chengdu — Li Donghai, (1857–1938) a traditional Chinese medicine practitioner
 October 18, Dantu, Jiangsu — Liu E, (1857 – 1909) writer, archaeologist and politician of the late Qing Dynasty
 Gansu — Ma Qixi (1857–1914; 馬啟西), a Hui from Gansu, was the founder of the Xidaotang, a Chinese-Islamic school of thought
 Hefei, Anhui — Li Jingxi (李經羲; 1857-?) politician in the Republic of China. He was the Premier of State Council in May–July 1917.[1]
 20 September 1857  — Imperial Noble Consort Gongsu (1857 – 1921) consort of the Tongzhi Emperor of the Qing dynasty
 Jiangsu — Mary Tape (1857–1934) was a desegregation activist who fought for Chinese-Americans' access to education, notably in the case Tape v. Hurley in 1885

Deaths 
 November 23 — Ren Xiong (Chinese: 任熊; 1823 – 1857) painter from Xiaoshan, Zhejiang

References